Sir Robert Archibald Cary, 1st Baronet (25 May 1898 – 1 October 1979) was a British Conservative politician.

Early life
The son of Robert Cary and Alice Day, he was educated at Ardingly College and at the Royal Military College, Sandhurst. Serving to the 4th/7th Royal Dragoon Guards, Cary fought in the First World War and Second World War.

Political career
From 1939 to 1942, he was Parliamentary Private Secretary to the Civil Lords of the Admiralty, from 1942 to 1945 to the Secretary of State for India and Burma. In 1944 and 1945, he was Assistant Government Whip and Junior Lord of the Treasury between May and July 1945. From 1951 to 1955 he was again Parliamentary Private Secretary, this time to the Lord Privy Seal and Leader of the House of Commons

Cary was Member of Parliament (MP) for Eccles from 1935 to 1945 and for Manchester Withington from 1951 until his retirement at the February 1974 general election. Knighted already in 1945, he was created a baronet, of Withington in the County Palatine of Lancaster on 12 July 1955.

Family
On 30 April 1924, he married Rosamond Mary Scarsdale, daughter of Colonel Alfred Nathaniel Curzon, son of Alfred Nathaniel Holden Curzon, 4th Baron Scarsdale. They had one son, Sir Roger Hugh Cary, 2nd Baronet.

References

External links 
 

1898 births
1979 deaths
People educated at Ardingly College
4th/7th Royal Dragoon Guards officers
Baronets in the Baronetage of the United Kingdom
British Army personnel of World War I
British Army personnel of World War II
Conservative Party (UK) MPs for English constituencies
Graduates of the Royal Military College, Sandhurst
UK MPs 1935–1945
UK MPs 1951–1955
UK MPs 1955–1959
UK MPs 1959–1964
UK MPs 1964–1966
UK MPs 1966–1970
UK MPs 1970–1974
Knights Bachelor
Ministers in the Churchill caretaker government, 1945